The 2021 MAAC women's soccer tournament was the postseason women's soccer tournament for the Metro Atlantic Athletic Conference held from October 31 through November 7, 2021. The seven-match tournament took place at campus sites, with the higher seed hosting matches.  The host for the matches was determined by seeding from regular season play.  The eight-team single-elimination tournament consisted of three rounds based on seeding from regular season conference play. The Siena Saints were the defending champions and were unable to defend their title, losing to the Quinnipiac Bobcats on pentalties in the semifinal.  The Monmouth Hawks won the title by defeating Quinnipiac 4–0 in the final.  This is Monmouth's sixth overall tournament win and fifth in the last six years.  The title is also the sixth for head coach Krissy Turner.  As tournament champions, Monmouth earned the MAAC's automatic berth into the 2021 NCAA Division I Women's Soccer Tournament.

Seeding 
The top eight teams in the regular season earned a spot in the tournament.  Three tiebreakers were required to finalize the seeding for the tournament.  Quinnipiac and Niagara tied for second place in the regular season standings, with identical 7–3–0 records.  Quinnipiac won the tiebreaker, and was awarded the second seed based on their 1–0 victory over Niagara on October 2 during the regular season.  Siena and Iona tied for fourth place in the regular season standings with identical 6–4–0 records.  The teams would play each other in the tournament, but a tiebreaker was used to determine the home team in the matchup.  Siena was awarded home field advantage based on their 3–2 victory over Iona on October 2 during the regular season.  Finally, Rider and Manhattan tied for eight place in the regular season standings and the final tournament berth.  Both teams finished with a 3–6–1 regular season record.  Rider earned the final tournament berth by virtue of their 1–0 win over Manhattan on October 9 during the regular season.

Bracket

Source:

Schedule

Quarterfinals

Semifinals

Final

Statistics

Goalscorers

All-Tournament team
Source:

MVP in bold

References 

2021 Metro Atlantic Athletic Conference women's soccer season
Metro Atlantic Athletic Conference Women's Soccer Tournament